This is a list of municipalities on the Delaware River and Delaware Bay from the confluence of the East Branch Delaware River and West Branch Delaware River downstream to the Atlantic Ocean. Since the river forms a state border for the entirety of its length (with the exception of Finns Point and Artificial Island), its left and right banks have distinct sets of municipalities. Unincorporated areas are not listed.

 City  Borough or town  Village  Township or New York town

Delaware River
Pennsylvania geography-related lists
New Jersey geography-related lists
Delaware geography-related lists
New York (state) geography-related lists
Lists of populated places in the United States